The South African Railways Class 33-000 of 1965 was a diesel-electric locomotive.

In 1965 and 1966, the South African Railways placed sixty-five  General Electric type U20C diesel-electric locomotives in service.

Manufacturer
The South African Class 33-000 type GE U20C diesel-electric locomotive was designed and built for the South African Railways (SAR) by General Electric (GE) and imported.

Class 33 series
Both manufacturers also produced locomotives for the subsequent SAR Classes 34, 35 and 36.

The two GE-built Classes were virtually identical in appearance, but could be distinguished from each other by some ventilation openings on their bodywork.
 The Class 33-000 had press-formed louvre openings in both short hood doors on the right-hand side of the nose, while the Class  had no opening in either of these doors.
 Just to the rear of the cab on both sides of the long hood and more or less in line with the cab windows, both models had panels with three ventilation openings.

These doors and panels could get swapped between models and sometimes did, either as replacement for damaged items or by chance during overhauls.

Service

In South Africa
The Class 33-000 was initially used to dieselise the Cape Midland region. When the Class 34-000 entered service in 1971, the Class 33-000 locomotives were relocated to Transvaal and some later to the Cape Western system.

In the SAR era, the inner parts of cabside locomotive number plates were often unofficially painted in various colours to identify the depot to which the locomotive was allocated. Judging from the flaked paint on the plate in the picture alongside, no. 33-014 saw service in several regions over the years.

Most of these locomotives survived in mainline and branch line service well into the twenty-first century, for example on the lines from De Aar to Upington and on the branch line from Worcester to Voorbaai. Some were later employed as heavy shunting engines to assemble or unload iron ore trains at the Sishen-Saldanha iron ore line's terminals, until the arrival of the Class  on that line in 2011 made more GE-built Class 34 locomotives available for this task.

Outside South Africa
Between October 1978 and May 1993, Zambia Railways (ZR) hired locomotives to solve its chronic shortages in motive power, mainly from South Africa but at times also from Zaire, Zimbabwe, the TAZARA Railway and even the Zambian copper mines. In Zambia, the South African locomotives were mainly used on goods trains between Livingstone and Kitwe, sometimes in tandem with a ZR locomotive and occasionally also on passenger trains.

Locomotives were selected from a pool of engines which were allocated by the Railways for hire to Zambia. The South African fleet in Zambia was never constant since locomotives were continually exchanged as they became due back in South Africa for their three-monthly servicings.

The locomotives were initially selected from the Classes 33-400, 35-000 and 35-200, but by December 1989 some Class  locomotives also began to serve one or more tours of duty in Zambia. The pool of Class  locomotives which were allocated by the Railways for hire to Zambia from time to time included the unit numbers as shown in the table.

Until c. 2015, several still saw service with Spoornet Traction whose locomotives operate in several Southern African countries. A few were leased to Sudan Railways on a long-term contract as a result of the distance from South Africa, while others were sold to COMILOG in Gabon.

Mozambique
In 2013 some Class 33-000 locomotives were sold to Corredor de Desenvolvimento do Norte (CDN) at Nacala in northern Mozambique. CDN operates a rail link with the land-locked Malawi to the west. These locomotives were refurbished in South Africa prior to being delivered to their new owners.

Democratic Republic of the Congo
In 2015, some Class 33-000 and Class 33-400 locomotives were sold to the Congolese Company for Transportation and Ports (SCTP, formerly Onatra) in the Democratic Republic of the Congo. These locomotives were also refurbished in South Africa prior to being delivered to their new owners.

Withdrawal

Although some of the locomotives had been sold to other operators over the years, most of the class remained in South African service for more than fifty years. During 2015, when sufficient numbers of new GE-designed Class  locomotives had entered service, several of the remaining Class 33-000 units were sold to, amongst others, TransNamib in Namibia and the Congolese Company for Transportation and Ports (SCTP, formerly Onatra) in the Democratic Republic of the Congo. Most of these locomotives were refurbished in South Africa prior to being delivered to their new owners.

Liveries
The class 33-000 were delivered in the new Gulf Red livery with yellow side-stripes on the long hood, a yellow V on each end, signal red buffer beams and unpainted steel cowcatchers. Most of them wore this livery throughout their SAR service life. In the Spoornet era, some of those leased to other countries were painted in a maroon livery with yellow and blue chevron buffer beams and inscribed "Spoornet Traction" on the long hood sides.

Works numbers
The Class 33-000 builder's works numbers, service in the Zambia Railways leasing pool and known eventual disposition are listed in the table.

Illustration

References

3320
C-C locomotives
Co′Co′ locomotives
Co+Co locomotives
General Electric locomotives
Cape gauge railway locomotives
Railway locomotives introduced in 1965
1965 in South Africa